Folketingstidende is an official publication issued by the Danish parliament, the Folketing. Folketingstidende contains summaries of negotiations conducted in the Folketing and a number of supplements.

Folketingstidende replaced Rigsdagstidendea yearly publication issued by Rigsdagen, the previous Danish parliamentin 1953 after the transition to a unicameral system due to the current constitution of 1953. It used to be a yearly publication, but since 6 October 2009 it is only issued on the Internet.

References

External links 
 

Politics of Denmark
Publications established in 1849
1849 establishments in Denmark